Bette Midler hit the road for the first time in four years with her 2003–2004 Kiss My Brass concert tour. The first leg of the tour kicked off on December 10 in Chicago and went through the middle of February. The tour hit the top 40 cities across the U.S. with one stop in Toronto, Ontario, Canada. The first leg of the tour ended in Atlantic City, New Jersey and the second leg of the tour began in Manchester, New Hampshire and ended in Minneapolis, Minnesota.

10 Australian dates were added in April and May 2005. It was the first Australian tour for Midler in 26 years.

On the tour, she performed well-known hits and characters, as well as selected songs from her release, Bette Midler Sings the Rosemary Clooney Songbook.

Setlist
Source:

"Kiss My Brass" / "Big Noise from Winnetka"
"Stuff Like That There"
"Skylark"
"Boogie Woogie Bugle Boy"
"Judge Judy" 
"I'm Sorry"
"Nobody Else But You"
"Friends"
"Tenderly"
"Chapel of Love"
"That's How Heartaches are Made"
"I Think It's Going to Rain Today"
"When a Man Loves a Woman"
"Walk Right In" 
"Those Wonderful Sophie Tucker Jokes"
"Shiver Me Timbers"
"Delores Delago: Fishtails Over Broadway" (Sketch Intermission)
"I Had a Dream" 
"Everything's Coming Up Roses" 
"Tonight"
"Cabaret"
"You'll Never Walk Alone"
"Tomorrow"
"And I Am Telling You I'm Not Going"
"All That Jazz"
"One"
"Hello, Dolly!"
"Give My Regards to Broadway"
"Oklahoma"
"I Like to Be Told" / "September"
"From A Distance"
"Do You Wanna Dance"
"Wind Beneath My Wings"
"Keep On Rockin'"
"The Rose"
"Friends"
"White Christmas"

Tour dates

Box office score data

Personnel
Bette Midler – Lead vocals
Bette Sussman – Musical director, piano 
Irwin Fisch – Synthesizers, keyboards
Sonny Emory – Drums
Lenny Castro – Percussion
Taku Hirano – Percussion 
John Harrington – Guitar
Mike Miller – Guitar
Zev Katz – Bass
Sam Sims – Bass
Kyra Da Costa – Background vocals
Kamilah Martin – Background vocals
Nicolette Hart – Background vocals
Eric Wangensteen – Trumpet
Scott Steen – Trumpet
Andrew Lippman – Trombone
Mando Dorame – Tenor saxophone
Jim Jedeikin – Baritone saxophone, alto saxophone, clarinet, flute

References

Bette Midler concert tours
2003 concert tours
2004 concert tours